I Never Promised You a Rose Garden (1964) is a semi-autobiographical novel by Joanne Greenberg, written under the pen name of Hannah Green. It served as the basis for a film in 1977 and a play in 2004.

Inspiration
The character of Dr. Fried is based closely on Greenberg's real doctor Frieda Fromm-Reichmann, and the hospital on Chestnut Lodge in Rockville, Maryland. While at Chestnut Lodge, Greenberg described a fantasy world called Iria to her doctors, quoting poetry in the Irian language. However, some of Greenberg's doctors felt that this was not a true delusion but rather something Greenberg had made up on the spot to impress her psychiatrist. One doctor went so far as to state that Irian was not an actual language, but was a form of bastardized Armenian. However, according to Gerald Schoenewolf, Irian was a conlang invented by Greenberg at an early age to prevent her father from reading her poetry, and had its own writing system resembling Chinese characters. Fromm-Reichmann wrote glowing reports focusing on Greenberg's genius and creativity, which she saw as signs of Greenberg's innate health, indicating that she had every chance of recovering from her mental illness.

Similar to what occurred in the novel, Greenberg was diagnosed with schizophrenia. At that time though, undifferentiated schizophrenia was often a vague diagnosis given to a patient or to medical records department for essentially non-medical reasons, which could have covered any number of mental illnesses from anxiety to depression.

Two psychiatrists who examined the book's description of protagonist Deborah Blau say that she was not schizophrenic, but rather suffered from extreme depression and somatization disorder.

See also
The Mad Woman's 18 Years

References

External links
 Biography of Frieda Fromm-Reichmann, with much information on Greenberg and her stay at Chestnut Lodge.
A 1995 lecture by Joanne Greenberg, exemplifying her personal style.
Appearances in a Rosegarden 2006 interview with Greenberg (free registration required)

1964 American novels
Roman à clef novels
American autobiographical novels
American novels adapted into films
English-language books
Fictional portrayals of schizophrenia
Books about mental health
Mental health in fiction
American novels adapted into plays
Works published under a pseudonym
Holt, Rinehart and Winston books